Mary Vere (1581–1671) was an English letter writer.

She was born Mary Tracy, a daughter of Sir John Tracy (died 1591) of Toddington, Gloucestershire and his wife Anne, a daughter of Thomas Throckmorton (died 1568). Her brother Sir Thomas Tracy was a member of the household of Anne of Denmark, as an usher of her privy chamber.

She married firstly, William Hoby (died 1603). They had two children.

In October or November 1607 she married the veteran soldier Horace Vere.

Their children included:
 Elizabeth Vere, who married John Holles, 2nd Earl of Clare
 Mary Vere, who married, (1) Sir Roger Townshend of Raynham in Norfolk, (2) Mildmay Fane, 2nd Earl of Westmorland
 Catherine Vere, who married, (1) Oliver St John, (2) John Poulett, 2nd Baron Poulett
 Anne Vere, who married Sir Thomas Fairfax in 1637
 Dorothy Vere, who married John Wolstenholme, eldest son of Sir John Wolstenholme of Nostell, Yorkshire
 Susanna Vere (1619–1623)

Mary Vere was a Puritan. She wrote "God will provide" at the front of most of the books in her closet. In 1608 she donated a book to Sir Thomas Bodley's library, and asked that it be inscribed in Latin as a gift from the daughter of Sir John Tracy. A number of religious works were dedicated to her.

She was widowed in 1635. Mary Vere lived at Hackney. Her chaplain Samuel Rogers kept a diary. He much preferred her to Margaret Denny, the widow of Edward Denny, his previous patron.

At the death of the widow of Lord Vere's eldest brother, John Vere, she inherited Kirby Hall, where she died on Christmas Eve 1671, aged 90.

References

1581 births
1671 deaths
17th-century English women
English letter writers